is a former  Japanese professional baseball pitcher. He played for the Chiba Lotte Marines and Yokohama DeNA BayStars.

Career
Chiba Lotte Marines selected him with the second selection in the 2011 NPB draft.

On March 1, 2016 Nakaushiro agreed to a minor league contract with the Arizona Diamondbacks of Major League Baseball. He spent 2016 with the AZL Diamondbacks, Kane County Cougars, Visalia Rawhide and Reno Aces, pitching to a combined 1.23 ERA with 40 strikeouts in 29.1 innings pitched. In 2017, he pitched for the Jackson Generals where he compiled a 1–2 record and 2.35 ERA in 48 relief appearances; he also was promoted and pitched in two games at the end of the season for Reno. Nakaushiro was released from the organization on June 18, 2018. On July 4, 2018, it was announced that Nakaushiro had signed with the Yokohama DeNA BayStars in the Nippon Professional Baseball (NPB).

On November 25, 2019, Nakaushiro announced his retirement.

References

External links

NPB

1989 births
Living people
Arizona League Diamondbacks players
Chiba Lotte Marines players
Jackson Generals (Southern League) players
Japanese expatriate baseball players in the United States
Kane County Cougars players
Nippon Professional Baseball pitchers
People from Kumatori, Osaka
Reno Aces players
Baseball people from Osaka Prefecture
Visalia Rawhide players
Yokohama DeNA BayStars players